Young Money was a bi-monthly publication that specializes in financial information for young adults. It sought to "change the way young adults earn, manage, invest and spend money." Young Money was launched in 1999 and specifically focused on money management, entrepreneurship, careers, investing, technology, travel, entertainment and automotive topics. The magazine was headquartered in Orlando, Florida. It ceased publication in 2009.

Financial advice
Young Money magazine offered financial advice for young adults. USA Today noted that Young Money "shifted its focus to the college-aged market" in 2002 The Washington Post described Young Money as "a personal finance magazine for adolescents". Todd Romer, the publisher of Young Money, was quoted in the Post article stating "More teens today are becoming aware of the significant advantage of starting to manage their money now while they're young".

Featuring young entrepreneurs
Young Money magazine often profiles the business experiences of young entrepreneurs. For example, in 2005 it profiled the founders of theplacefinder.com, a website that provides detailed information about housing for college students. Additionally in 2005 it featured the founders of workscited4u.com, a website that automatically generates works cited pages. The article reported on the experiences of the site's founders in setting up the website and maintaining it.

Reviews
A number of other periodicals have reviewed Young Money, including the Washington Post, Orlando Sentinel, USA Today, and The Gazette.

References

Bimonthly magazines published in the United States
Business magazines published in the United States
Defunct magazines published in the United States
Magazines established in 1999
Magazines disestablished in 2009
Magazines published in Florida
Mass media in Orlando, Florida
1999 establishments in Florida